The 2016–17 PBA season was the 42nd season of the Philippine Basketball Association. The league continues to use the three-conference format, starting with the Philippine Cup. The Commissioner's Cup and the Governors' Cup are the second and third conferences in the upcoming season.

The first event of the season was the 2016 PBA draft, held on October 30.

Executive board
 Andres Narvasa, Jr. (commissioner) 
 Michael Romero (Chairman, representing GlobalPort Batang Pier)
 Ramoncito Fernandez (vice chairman, representing NLEX Road Warriors)
 Richard Bachmann (treasurer, representing Alaska Aces)

Teams

Coaching changes

Arenas
Like several Metro Manila-centric leagues, most games are held at arenas within Metro Manila, either the Smart Araneta Coliseum or the Mall of Asia Arena, and sometimes, in the Ynares Center in Antipolo. Games outside this area are called "out-of-town" games, and are usually played on Saturdays. Provincial arenas usually host one game, rarely two; these arenas typically host only once per season, but a league may return within a season if the turnout is satisfactory.

Typically, all playoff games are held in Metro Manila arenas, although playoff and Finals games have been seldom played in the provinces.

Main arenas

Out-of-town arenas

Highlighted are playoff games.

Transactions

Retirement
September 10, 2016: Michael Burtscher officially announced his retirement after playing 5 seasons in the PBA.
November 3, 2016: Jimmy Alapag officially announced his retirement after playing 13 seasons in the PBA.
November 18, 2016: Yousef Taha officially announced that he  left the country back to his hometown Kuwait, thereby ending his PBA career. Taha, though not officially retiring, said that he left for personal reasons and "he felt that it is best for him to not continue his PBA career". Taha played for five different teams in his 4 seasons in the league. However, he returned to the country to play again a year later.
November 19, 2016: Nelbert Omolon officially announced his retirement after playing 12 seasons in the PBA to focus on his agribusiness career.
November 27, 2016: Eddie Laure officially announced his retirement after playing 12 seasons in the PBA to focus on new role as coach for UST.
December 15, 2016: Rob Reyes officially announced his retirement after playing 8 seasons in the PBA.
May 7, 2017: Eric Menk officially announced his retirement after playing 16 seasons in the PBA.
September 2, 2017: Mick Pennisi officially announced his retirement after playing 17 seasons in the PBA.

Coaching changes

Offseason
 October 7, 2016: Yeng Guiao resigned as coach of the Rain or Shine Elasto Painters. Assistant coach Caloy Garcia takes over as head coach of the Elasto Painters. Guiao was then signed as the head coach of the NLEX Road Warriors replacing Boyet Fernandez, who will still be with NLEX on a different capacity.
 October 14, 2016: Star Hotshots head coach Jason Webb was appointed as team consultant. Chito Victolero will take over as the Hotshots' head coach.
 October 22, 2016: TNT KaTropa appointed Nash Racela to be its head coach replacing Jong Uichico.

Philippine Cup
 November 25, 2016: GlobalPort Batang Pier formally appointed team consultant Franz Pumaren to be its head coach replacing Johnedel Cardel, who was then relegated as an assistant coach.

Notable events

Pre-season
 The Mahindra Enforcer silently changed their name to Mahindra Floodbuster. The team's new logo debuted during the league's annual draft.
 November 14 – The PBA officially launched its own smartphone application named "PBA: The App" which is currently available on Google Play and Apple App Store. The app featured news articles, scores, schedules, stats of the games and profiles of the teams and players.

Philippine Cup
 December 25 – The league held its Christmas games at the Philippine Arena, featuring games between Blackwater Elite vs Mahindra Floodbuster and Barangay Ginebra San Miguel vs Star Hotshots. This is the second time the league held its games at the venue.
The San Miguel Beermen won their third straight Philippine Cup championship against Barangay Ginebra San Miguel, four games to one. The Beermen also became the second PBA franchise to keep permanent possession of the Jun Bernardino Trophy.

Commissioner's Cup
 The league took two week-long breaks during the Commissioner's Cup: first during the All-Star Week (April 26 to 30) and second during the Philippines' hosting of the SEABA Championship (May 12 to 18).
 A different All-Star Week format was adopted for this season. Three PBA All-Star teams, one each with players representing Luzon, Visayas and Mindanao pitted against Gilas Pilipinas, the men's national basketball team. Gilas Pilipinas players played for the PBA All-Star team if they hail to the game's host region.
 PBA Chairman Mikee Romero was issued with a warrant of arrest by the Manila Regional Trial Court over allegations that he stole P3.4 million from his family's company Harbour Centre Port Terminal Inc. While Romero will remain as the PBA Chairman, Ramoncito Fernandez of the NLEX Road Warriors will be the acting chairman of the board of governors during Romero's absence.
 April 28 – After the Luzon leg of the All-Star Week, Gilas Pilipinas coach Chot Reyes announced the 12 man lineup that will compete for the SEABA Championship. Subsequently, the All-Star Game team lineups for the Visayas leg scheduled on April 30 were altered. June Mar Fajardo and Terrence Romeo, originally supposed to play for the PBA Visayas All-Stars were transferred to the Gilas Pilipinas team. LA Tenorio and Rabeh Al-Hussaini replaced them in the PBA Visayas All-Stars lineup.
 May 28 – Barangay Ginebra San Miguel wore their throwback 1991 Ginebra San Miguel jerseys in honor of the team who won the 1991 First Conference championship coming from a 1–3 deficit.
 June 14 – Barangay Ginebra San Miguel wore their throwback 1996 Ginebra San Miguel jerseys.

Governors' Cup
 The Mahindra Floodbuster changed their name to Kia Picanto. The team's new logo and uniforms debuted at the opening day of the Governors' Cup on July 19.
 August 26 – Barangay Ginebra San Miguel wore their throwback 2001 Barangay Ginebra Kings jerseys in honor of the team who won PBA championships from 2004 to 2008.
 October 22 – Game 5 of the Governors' Cup Finals between Barangay Ginebra and Meralco held at the Philippine Arena set the all-time PBA finals attendance record of 36,445, breaking the previous record of 23,436 fans during Game 3 of the 2013 Commissioner's Cup between Alaska and Barangay Ginebra.
 October 25 – 53,642 fans attended Game 6 of the Governors' Cup Finals at the Philippine Arena. This record broke the finals attendance record as well as the all-time overall attendance record of 52,612, set during the opening of 2014–15 season on October 19, 2014.
 October 27 – Game 7 of the Governors' Cup finals broke the records set on October 22 and 25 as 54,086 fans watched the series clinching game between Barangay Ginebra and Meralco.

Opening ceremonies
The opening ceremonies for this season was held at the Smart Araneta Coliseum in Quezon City on November 20, 2016. The first game of the Philippine Cup between the Star Hotshots and the San Miguel Beermen immediately followed.

The muses for the participating teams are as follows:

2016–17 Philippine Cup

Elimination round

Playoffs

Quarterfinals 

|}

|}
*Team has twice-to-beat advantage. Team #1 only has to win once, while Team #2 has to win twice.

Semifinals 

|}

Finals 

|}
Finals MVP: Chris Ross 
Best Player of the Conference: June Mar Fajardo

2017 Commissioner's Cup

Elimination round

Playoffs

Quarterfinals 

|}

|}
*Team has twice-to-beat advantage. Team #1 only has to win once, while Team #2 has to win twice.

Semifinals 

|}

Finals 

|}
Finals MVP: Alex Cabagnot 
Best Player of the Conference: Chris Ross 
Bobby Parks Best Import of the Conference: Charles Rhodes

2017 Governors' Cup

Elimination round

Playoffs

Quarterfinals 

|}*Team has twice-to-beat advantage. Team #1 only has to win once, while Team #2 has to win twice.

Semifinals 

|}

Finals 

|}
Finals MVP: LA Tenorio 
Best Player of the Conference: Greg Slaughter 
Bobby Parks Best Import of the Conference: Allen Durham

Individual awards

Leo Awards

Most Valuable Player: June Mar Fajardo (San Miguel)
Rookie of the Year: Roger Pogoy (TNT)
First Mythical Team:
 Alex Cabagnot (San Miguel)
 Chris Ross (San Miguel)
 June Mar Fajardo (San Miguel)
 Japeth Aguilar (Barangay Ginebra)
 Arwind Santos (San Miguel)
Second Mythical Team:
 Jayson Castro (TNT)
 LA Tenorio (Barangay Ginebra)
 Kelly Williams (TNT)
 Joe Devance (Barangay Ginebra)
 Cliff Hodge (Meralco)
All-Defensive Team:
 Jio Jalalon (Star)
 Chris Ross (San Miguel)
 June Mar Fajardo (San Miguel)
 Japeth Aguilar (Barangay Ginebra)
 Gabe Norwood (Rain or Shine)
Most Improved Player: Chris Ross (San Miguel)
Samboy Lim Sportsmanship Award: Gabe Norwood (Rain or Shine)

Awards given by the PBA Press Corps
 Scoring Champion: Terrence Romeo (GlobalPort)
 Baby Dalupan Coach of the Year: Leo Austria (San Miguel)
 Mr. Quality Minutes: Jio Jalalon (Star)
 Bogs Adornado Comeback Player of the Year: Kelly Williams (TNT)
 Danny Floro Executive of the Year:  Ramon S. Ang (San Miguel Corporation teams)
 Defensive Player of the Year: Chris Ross (San Miguel)
 Order of Merit: LA Tenorio (Barangay Ginebra)
All-Rookie Team
 Roger Pogoy (TNT)
 Jio Jalalon (Star)
 Matthew Wright (Phoenix)
 Kevin Ferrer (Barangay Ginebra)
 Reden Celda (Kia)
All-Interview Team
 Tim Cone (Barangay Ginebra)
 Jayson Castro (TNT)
 Ranidel de Ocampo (Meralco)
 Beau Belga (Rain or Shine)
 LA Tenorio (Barangay Ginebra)
 Game of the Season: Barangay Ginebra San Miguel vs. Star Hotshots (September 3, 2017, Governors' Cup eliminations)

Statistics

Individual statistical leaders

Local players

Import players

Individual game highs

Local players

Import players

Team statistical leaders

Cumulative standings

Elimination rounds

Playoffs

References

External links
 PBA Official Website

 
PBA